Steffen Schneider (born 9 June 1988) is a German footballer who plays for SSC Juno Burg.

Career
He made his debut on the professional league level in the 2. Bundesliga for FC Ingolstadt 04 on 16 November 2008 when he came on as a substitute in the 68th minute in a game against 1. FC Nürnberg.

References

1988 births
Living people
German footballers
FC Ingolstadt 04 players
VfR Aalen players
2. Bundesliga players
3. Liga players
Association football forwards